Charles Beary Landis (July 9, 1858 – April 24, 1922) was an American newspaperman and politician who served six terms as a U.S. Representative from Indiana from 1897 to 1909.

Early life and career 
He was a brother of both Congressman Frederick Landis and of Baseball Commissioner Kenesaw Mountain Landis.

Born in Millville, Ohio, Landis attended the public schools of Logansport, Indiana, and graduated from Wabash College, Crawfordsville, Indiana, in 1883, where he was a member of Tau chapter of Beta Theta Pi. He was editor of the Logansport Journal 1883-1887 (which later became part of the Pharos-Tribune) and at the time of his nomination for Congress was editor of the Delphi (Indiana) Journal. He served as president of the Indiana Republican Editorial Association in 1894 and 1895.

Congress 
Landis was elected as a Republican to the Fifty-fifth and to the five succeeding Congresses (March 4, 1897 – March 3, 1909). He was an unsuccessful candidate for reelection in 1908.

Later career and death
Landis resumed newspaper work in Delphi, Indiana. He died at the age of 63 in Asheville, North Carolina, where he had gone because of impaired health, April 24, 1922. He was interred in Mount Hope Cemetery, Logansport, Indiana.

References

External links
Charles Beary Landis entry at The Political Graveyard 

 
 
 
 

1858 births
1922 deaths
American newspaper editors
People from Butler County, Ohio
People from Montgomery County, Indiana
Wabash College alumni
People from Delphi, Indiana
Journalists from Ohio
Republican Party members of the United States House of Representatives from Indiana